Toni Micevski (born 20 January 1970) is a North Macedonia former professional footballer who played as a midfielder.

Club career
Micevski was born in Bitola, SFR Yugoslavia. He went on to spend a large part of his professional career in Germany.

International career
Micevski made his senior debut for Macedonia in an October 1993 friendly match away against Slovenia, which was his country's first ever official match, and got 44 caps and four goals. He scored his first goal against Armenia in Skopje on 6 September 1995 (1–2). His final international was an April 2002 friendly against Finland.

Personal life
In 2018, despite his age, he was still playing for FK Poeševo in the Macedonian fourth league group Bitola, together with another well known veteran in Goran Stavrevski.

Career statistics

International goals
Scores and results list Macedonia's goal tally first, score column indicates score after each Micevski goal.

References

External links
 
 Profile at MacedonianFootball.com 
 
 
 German career stats - FuPa

1970 births
Living people
Sportspeople from Bitola
Association football midfielders
Yugoslav footballers
Macedonian footballers
North Macedonia international footballers
FK Pelister players
FK Sileks players
FC Hansa Rostock players
Tennis Borussia Berlin players
FC Energie Cottbus players
FK Pobeda players
VfL Osnabrück players
USV Eschen/Mauren players
Yugoslav First League players
Macedonian First Football League players
Bundesliga players
2. Bundesliga players
Regionalliga players
Macedonian expatriate footballers
Expatriate footballers in Germany
Macedonian expatriate sportspeople in Germany
Expatriate footballers in Liechtenstein